Íñigo de Martino (5 January 1905 – 3 September 2006) was a Mexican screenwriter and film director.

Selected filmography
 Juan Pistolas (1936)
 Enamorada (1946)
 The Genius (1948)
 The Torch (1950)
 Love for Love (1950)
 Doña Perfecta (1951)
 Acapulco (1952)
 The White Rose (1954 film) (1954)
 The Rapture (1954)

References

Bibliography
 Van Wagenen, Michael. Remembering the Forgotten War: The Enduring Legacies of the U.S./Mexican War. Univ of Massachusetts Press, 2012.

External links

1905 births
2006 deaths
Mexican centenarians
Film directors from Mexico City
Writers from Mexico City
20th-century Mexican screenwriters
20th-century Mexican male writers